Pentagenia vittigera is a species of riverbed burrower mayfly in the family Palingeniidae. It is found in North America.

References

Mayflies
Articles created by Qbugbot
Insects described in 1862